Ziano Piacentino is a comune (municipality) in the Province of Piacenza in the Italian region Emilia-Romagna, located about  northwest of Bologna and about  west of Piacenza.   
Ziano Piacentino borders the following municipalities: Alta Val Tidone, Borgonovo Val Tidone, Castel San Giovanni, Rovescala, Santa Maria della Versa.

Twin towns
Ziano Piacentino is twinned with:

  Pont-de-l'Isère, France

References

Cities and towns in Emilia-Romagna